There have been two baronetcies created for persons with the surname Boulton, both in the Baronetage of the United Kingdom.

The Boulton Baronetcy, of Copped Hall, Totteridge, in the County of Hertford, was created in the Baronetage of the United Kingdom for Samuel Bagster Boulton, the founder and chairman of the London Labour Conciliation Board. The title became either extinct or dormant on the death of his great-grandson, the fourth Baronet, in 1996.

The Boulton Baronetcy, of Braxted Park in the County of Essex, was created in the Baronetage of the United Kingdom for the Conservative politician William Whytehead Boulton. He represented Sheffield Central in the House of Commons from 1931 to 1945. As of 2010 the title is held by his grandson, the fourth Baronet, who succeeded his father in 2010.

Boulton baronets, of Copped Hall (1905)

Sir Samuel Bagster Boulton, 1st Baronet (1830–1918)
Sir Harold Edwin Boulton, 2nd Baronet (1859–1935)
Sir (Denis Duncan) Harold Owen Boulton, 3rd Baronet (1892–1968)
Sir (Harold Hugh) Christian Boulton, 4th Baronet (1918–1996)

Boulton baronets, of Braxted Park (1944)
Sir William Whytehead Boulton, 1st Baronet (1873–1949)
Sir Edward John Boulton, 2nd Baronet (1907–1982)
Sir William Whytehead Boulton, 3rd Baronet (1912–2010)
Sir John Gibson Boulton, 4th Baronet (born 1946)

Notes

References 
Kidd, Charles, Williamson, David (editors). Debrett's Peerage and Baronetage (1990 edition). New York: St Martin's Press, 1990, 

Boulton
Boulton family
Extinct baronetcies in the Baronetage of the United Kingdom